The Surinamese Immigrants' Association was formed in 1910 in Suriname, then the Dutch colony of Surinam. The association's goal was to advocate for the interests of the East Indian diaspora in Suriname, particularly contract laborers.

In 1921 the Association requested that the ban on ganja (cannabis) be lifted and an import and sales concession be granted to them.

References

Politics of Suriname
Political organisations based in Suriname
Indian diaspora in Suriname
Organisations based in Suriname
1910 in Suriname
Organizations established in 1910